Verbnoye is a rural locality (a selo) in Krasnensky District, Belgorod Oblast, Russia. The population was 102 as of 2010. There are 3 streets.

Geography 
Verbnoye is located 18 km south of Krasnoye (the district's administrative centre) by road. Gotovye is the nearest rural locality.

References 

Rural localities in Krasnensky District

Renamed localities of Belgorod Oblast